Peter V'landys  is an Australian horse racing administrator. He is the chief executive and a board member of Racing New South Wales (Racing NSW) as well as the chairman of the Australian Rugby League Commission.

Personal life 

V'landys grew up in Wollongong where he attended Keira Boys High School before graduating in 1984 from the University of Wollongong with a Bachelor of Commerce degree, majoring in accountancy.  He is of Greek heritage from Kythira; the spelling "V'landys" is an alternative spelling of his original Greek surname "Vlandis", first used by one of his high school teachers.

Racing administration 
V'landys became involved in racing administration in 1988 when he was appointed chief executive of the New South Wales (NSW) Harness Racing Club. Under his administration, the NSW Harness Racing Club established several commercial enterprises that provided it with the broadest revenue base of any racing club in Australia.

During this period V'landys also played a role in negotiating the $1 billion privatisation of the NSW TAB and the restructuring of the racing industry's finances.

In 2004 he was appointed chief executive and board member of Racing NSW. In this role V'landys also sits as a board member of several other NSW and Australian racing and wagering industry boards.

Career

Equine influenza outbreak 
In mid-2007, the racing industry was brought to a standstill as a result of an outbreak of equine influenza.  New South Wales was the worst affected state with all racing cancelled and the movement of all horses prohibited indefinitely.

V'landys assumed responsibility for the overall co-ordination of the industry's response to this crisis, and developed and implemented contingency plans to counter the effects of the outbreak, including negotiating a $235 million rescue package.

He also lobbied NSW ministers for the provision of further financial assistance which resulted in the provision of a $7.5 million grants scheme and the establishment of a special mortgage deferment scheme and a further one-off grant to help promote the industry following the resumption of normal racing activities.

World Youth Day negotiations 
Following the government's announcement that the World Youth Day 2008 would be held in Sydney and centred at Randwick Racecourse, V'landys coordinated the industry's planning for the use of the racecourse and the disruption which would be caused to the racing industry.  This included negotiating a $40 million compensation package for the racing industry.

Race field legislation 
V'landys in 2008 was responsible for enforcing corporate bookmakers and other wagering operators to pay racing for the use of its product. Up until then the bookmakers paid very little and determined themselves how much to pay.
After first looking at enforcing copyright led V’landys to Race Field legislation.
The bookmakers challenged Racing NSW all the way to the high court.
The High Court found in favour of Racing NSW in a unanimous decision.
The win meant racing would earn over a billion dollars in the next ten years.
It also meant that sport could also charge the Bookmakers for the use of its product making millions of dollars for sport.
.

Trackside 
In 2010 V'Landys negotiated the sale to Tabcorp of the Racing NSW future revenues from the Trackside computer racing game.  This sale realised $150 million and allowed the development of new spectator facilities at the Randwick Racecourse.

Recognition 
In 2013 he was ranked with John Messara as the 40th of Sydney's most influential people and The Australian ranked him 22nd of the top 50 people in Australian sport.

In 2019, the Sydney Daily Telegraph ranked V'Landys 6th from among a list of 100 of Sydney's most powerful and influential people.

V'Landys was awarded Member of the Order of Australia in the 2014 Australia Day Honours for service to horse racing.

Tax parity 
In 2015, along with John Messara, V’Landys negotiated with the NSW state government for the introduction of legislation to reduce the rate of government tax on totalisator and fixed-odds betting through Tabcorp to bring it into line with the rate of tax paid in Victoria.

The Everest race
In February 2017, V'Landys devised a new race called the Everest, which was to be conducted over 1200 metres and carry prize money of $10 million, making it the richest race in Australia and in the world on turf. The inaugural Everest race was run at Randwick Racecourse on 14 October 2017. It attracted a record crowd to Randwick Racecourse as well as record betting on an NSW race.

In conjunction with the second running of the Everest, V'Landys also devised and implemented another new and unique race, The Kosciusko, which was specifically directed towards country trained horses and carried prizemoney of $1.3 million making it the world's richest country race.

Prior to the 2018 event, the race attracted criticism from the Australian public and media after organisers of the event successfully lobbied for the sails of the UNESCO World Heritage Site Sydney Opera House to be used as an advertisement for the race. Public backlash and protests against this proposal and government support of it were held at the Opera House along with submission of a petition with over 300,000 signatures collected in less than a week in October 2018, but the pre-race event went ahead in a modified format.

Australian Rugby League Commission
On 13 March 2018, V'Landys was appointed as an independent board member of the Australian Rugby League Commission (ARLC) which also conducts the National Rugby League Competition (NRL). His appointment received the unanimous support of the 16 clubs that participate in that competition.  On 30 October 2019, V'Landys assumed the role of Chairman of the ARLC and NRL replacing the outgoing chairman, Peter Beattie.  Shortly after his appointment as chairman, he successfully re-negotiated the Code's broadcast arrangements with Channel 9 and Foxtel and was instrumental in the resumption of the NRL season on 28 May 2020, after it was suspended following round two as a result of the COVID pandemic. This involved negotiating successfully with the NSW, Queensland, Victorian and New Zealand Governments, the NRL Clubs, the Code's broadcast partners and the NRL Players Association plus the implementation of strict protocols and bio-security measures for players and spectators.

Subsequently, when the NRL competition was again threatened by the Delta variant of the Coronavirus in mid-2021, V’landys along with NRL Chief Executive Andrew Abdo and the NRL Commission made a call to relocate the nine Sydney-based clubs, as well as the Knights and Raiders to Queensland and play the remaining 2021 season matches in that State thereby again securing the financial stability of the NRL.

Horse racing industry's failure to protect retired horses from mass slaughter 
Following a two-year special investigation into the horse racing industry, Australian investigative journalist Caro Meldrum-Hanna interviewed V'landys in his role as chief executive of Racing NSW. The special investigation report aired on 17 October 2019 on the ABC's 7.30 Report, hosted by Leigh Sales. The whistleblowing special investigation was titled, 'The dark side of the horse racing industry - A special investigation into the horse racing industry reveals what really goes on when racehorses' lives end in knackeries and abattoirs.'

In response to the ABC airing the special report, there was wide criticism from media and public outrage with the racing industry and Racing NSW. The Guardian reported, 'Footage showed horses being beaten, kicked and shocked with electric prods while they lay dying in abattoirs, and raised questions about the racing industry's claims about its rehoming program for racehorses.'

The Age, reported, 'The ABC's 7.30 program uncovered alleged acts of animal cruelty on a mass scale, with allegations hundreds of Australian racehorses are being sent to be killed for their meat. This is despite the racing industry in most states, including Racing Victoria, promoting programs dedicated to supporting retired thoroughbred racehorses.'   "There's a massive question mark over the regulator and the problems with self-regulation come into play yet again," Professor McGreevy said. V'landys said he was "unaware" of any NSW racehorses being sent to an abattoir or knackery, including slaughterhouses in NSW and interstate.

References

External links 
 Racing NSW website

Year of birth missing (living people)
Living people
Australian chief executives
Australian people of Greek descent
People from Wollongong
Members of the Order of Australia
Australian sports executives and administrators
University of Wollongong alumni